The Sun is a ferry on the Hawkesbury River in New South Wales, Australia. Originally planned as a cream boat for the dairy farmers on the Manning River, it was built some time during World War II. Based at Brooklyn since 1978, on the Dangar Island / Wobby Beach ferry service, carrying a maximum of 62 passengers. Another craft also known as the Sun was built in 1921 by Allan Kell & Sons at Harrington for the Manning River Dairy Co-op.

References

External links

Ferries of New South Wales
Hawkesbury River

Water transport in New South Wales